Leptomyrmex wiburdi is a species of ant in the genus Leptomyrmex. Described by William Morton Wheeler in 1915, the species is endemic to Australia.

References

Dolichoderinae
Hymenoptera of Australia
Insects described in 1915